Our Band Could Be Your Life: A Tribute to D Boon and the Minutemen was a tribute album for the band The Minutemen released in 1996. It contains 35 tracks of alternative bands covering songs by The Minutemen.

Track listing 
(All songs written by D. Boon unless otherwise noted)
 Sparkalepsy – "King of the Hill" – 3:37
 Seam – "This Aint No Picnic" – 2:40
 Overpass – "Fake Contest" (Mike Watt) – 1:49
 Hazel – "Storm In My House" (D. Boon/Henry Rollins) – 2:04
 Nuzzle – "Futurism Restated" (Joe Boon/Mike Watt) – 0:58
 Oswald Five-O – "Tony Gets Wasted in Pedro" (Rick Lazaroff/Mike Watt) – 1:48
 Joe Boon & Tony Platon – "Sickles and Hammers" (D. Boon/Mike Watt) – 0:49
 The Brain Surgeons – "Tour-Spiel" (Mike Watt) – 2:53
 The 3M Company – "Search" (George Hurley/Mike Watt) – 0:57
 Treepeople – "Shit From an Old Notebook" (D. Boon/Mike Watt) – 1:54
 Vida – "'99" – 1:06
 Ethan James & Cindy Albon – "Themselves" – 2:41
 Tsunami – "Courage" – 2:27
 Cellophane – "More Joy" (D. Boon/Dez Cadena/Mike Watt) – 1:15
 Strawman – "Untitled Song for Latin America" – 2:14
 Meat Puppets – "The Price of Paradise" – 3:19
 Crackerbash – "The World According to Nouns" (Mike Watt) – 2:50
 Nels Cline Trio – "Self-Referenced/West Germany" (D. Boon/Mike Watt) – 3:37
 Dos – "Do You Want New Wave or Do You Want the Truth" (Mike Watt) – 2:01
 Experimental Polen #68 – "Games" (D. Boon/Mike Watt) – 1:04
 Overwhelming Colorfast – "Corona" – 3:08
 Free Kitten – "Party With Me Punker" (Mike Watt) – 0:56
 Jawbox – "Its Expected I'm Gone" (Mike Watt) – 2:28
 Locos Borachos – "The Product" – 2:41
 Thurston Moore – "Shit You Hear At Parties" (D. Boon/Mike Watt) – 1:32
 Joe Baiza – "9:30 May 2" (Mike Watt) – 0:58
 67 Riot – "Case Closed" (D. Boon/Mike Watt) – 1:33
 Kaia – "Stories" (Kira Roessler/Mike Watt) – 1:29
 Unwound – "Plight" (D. Boon/Mike Watt) – 1:55
 The Meices – "Political Song For Michael Jackson to Sing" (Mike Watt) – 1:32
 Blowout – "Times" (Mike Watt) – 0:49
 Corduroy – "Cut" (Mike Watt) – 2:06
 Lou Barlow – "Black Sheep" (George Hurley/Mike Watt) – 1:23
 D. Boon – "Interview" – 8:13
 The Minutemen – "Badges" (Mike Watt) – 0:46

1996 compilation albums
Alternative rock compilation albums
Minutemen (band) tribute albums